Gran Premio Internacional de Llodio (also known as Clásica de Álava) is a Spanish professional cycle road race that was held in Llodio, Basque Country, between 1949 and 2011. From 2005 to 2011, the race was organised as a 1.1 event on the UCI Europe Tour.

Winners

References

External links
  
 UCI profile of the race

Cycle races in the Basque Country
Recurring sporting events established in 1949
Recurring sporting events disestablished in 2011
1949 establishments in Spain
2011 disestablishments in Spain
UCI Europe Tour races
Defunct cycling races in Spain